is a large Western-style park in Hakodate, Hokkaidō, Japan, at the foot of Mount Hakodate. Opened in 1879, it is a registered as a "place of scenic beauty" in Japan's Law for the Protection of Cultural Properties. It contains the Hakodate City Museum, as well as a small zoo and children's theme park ("Kodomo no Kuni"), and is a popular site for cherry blossom viewing.

History

In 1874, a simple park was established at the current site of Hakodate Park. It was not until the year leading up to 1879, however, that the park took on its current unique form through a proposal of Richard Eusden, the British Consul of Hakodate, and with the support of the citizens of Hakodate. Eusden brought the influence of European culture and early concepts of city planning, with strong involvement of the inhabitants of Hakodate. It is these unique origins that bring Hakodate Park its distinct character among public parks in Japan.

At the suggestion of Horace Capron, advisor to Japan's Hokkaidō Development Commission, a museum (Hakodate City Museum) was opened in the park in 1879. This is the oldest of all museums located in Japanese parks.

References

External Links
Hakodate Housing and City Facilities Public Corporation page on Hakodate Park (jp)
Kodomo no Kuni website (jp)

Tourist attractions in Hokkaido
Special Historic Sites
Special Places of Scenic Beauty
Hanami spots of Japan
Hakodate